Karzok or Korzok is a village in the Leh district of Ladakh, India. It is located close to Nyoma, in the Rupshu region and block, on the shores of the Tso Moriri lake. It is among the highest towns in the world and the highest settlement in India. Various sources give slightly different measurements of the altitude from 14,995 ft (4,570 m) to 15,075 ft (4,595 m) above sea level. The Drukpa Buddhist Korzok Monastery is located here.

History 
Karzok was on the Central Asian trade route until 1947 and was the headquarters of the Rupshu Valley. One of the kings, Rupshu Goba, who lived there with his family, built nine permanent houses there.

The village has several houses, and the nomadic population who establish their tents (made of yak hair or skin) in summer, add to the agricultural operations in the region. The tents are provided with vents at the top to let out the smoke. Pashmina is the valuable product that the Changmas trade along with the salt that they extract from large salt fields in the area, such as the springs at Puga. They barter these two products for food grains and other necessities. In recent years, building activity is on the rise with the nomadic tribes changing their lifestyle.

Demographics 

According to the 2011 census of India, Karzok has 253 households. The effective literacy rate (i.e. the literacy rate of population excluding children aged 6 and below) is 46.64%.

Climate 
Karzok has a subarctic climate (Köppen classification Dfc) bordering on a tundra climate (ET). Summers are cool with chilly nights, and winters are long and cold with lows below zero.

References

 Villages in Nyoma tehsil